A. K. Premajam (born 8 December 1938) is an Indian Parliamentarian and social worker.

Early life and education
A. K. Premajam was born in Pallikkunnu, Kannur, Kerala. She was educated in Providence College under Calicut University, Government Brennen College, Thalassery under Madras University and University College under Kerala University. She has a master's degree in arts. She started her career as a teacher. She was the Principal of Government Arts College, Kozhikode from 1991 to 1994.

Political career
A.K Premajam started her political career as the Mayor of Kozhikode. holding the office from 1995 to 1998, and then from 2010 to 2015. She was elected to the 12th Lok Sabha in 1998 and to the 13th Lok Sabha in 1999.  She was the member of the Essential Committee on Food, Joint Committee on the Empowerment of Women and Consultative Committee of the Ministry of Food and Consumer Affairs during her tenure as the Member of Parliament. She is the Member of Central Committee, All India Democratic Women's Association.

References 

1938 births
Living people
India MPs 1998–1999
India MPs 1999–2004
Communist Party of India (Marxist) politicians from Kerala
Social workers
Mayors of Kozhikode
Lok Sabha members from Kerala
Women mayors of places in Kerala
Politicians from Kozhikode
University of Calicut alumni
University of Madras alumni
University of Kerala alumni
20th-century Indian women politicians
20th-century Indian politicians
21st-century Indian women politicians
21st-century Indian politicians
20th-century Indian educators
21st-century Indian educators
Educators from Kerala
Women educators from Kerala
Social workers from Kerala
20th-century women educators
21st-century women educators
Women members of the Lok Sabha